The 10th Cavalry Division (10-ya Kavaleriiskaya Diviziya) was a cavalry formation of the Russian Imperial Army.

Organization
1st Cavalry Brigade
Novgorod 10th Regiment of Dragoons
Odessa 10th Uhlan Regiment
2nd Cavalry Brigade
Ingermanland 10th Regiment of Hussars
 Orenburg 1st Regiment of Cossacks
10th Horse Artillery Division

Commanders (Division Chiefs) 
1897-1899: Vladimir Sukhomlinov
1899–1901: Georgii Stackelberg
1905: Petr Alexandrovich Mashin (acting)
1908-1912: Georgy Ottonovich Rauch

Chiefs of Staff
1894-1899: Pavel Savvich
1903-1910: Abram Dragomirov

References

Cavalry divisions of the Russian Empire
Military units and formations disestablished in 1918